In Greek mythology, Orus (Ancient Greek: Ὦρος, accusative Ὦρον 'Horus') may refer to two different characters

 Orus, the "first to be born" in the land about the Troezen and also first king of that kingdom which was then called Oraea after him. He had a daughter Leis who consorted with the sea-god Poseidon. Their son Althepus succeeded Orus to the throne, and thereafter renamed the land as Althepia.
 Orus, an Achaean soldier who was slain by the Trojan Prince Hector during the siege of Troy.

Notes

References 

 Homer, The Iliad with an English Translation by A.T. Murray, Ph.D. in two volumes. Cambridge, MA., Harvard University Press; London, William Heinemann, Ltd. 1924. . Online version at the Perseus Digital Library.
 Homer, Homeri Opera in five volumes. Oxford, Oxford University Press. 1920. . Greek text available at the Perseus Digital Library.
 Pausanias, Description of Greece with an English Translation by W.H.S. Jones, Litt.D., and H.A. Ormerod, M.A., in 4 Volumes. Cambridge, MA, Harvard University Press; London, William Heinemann Ltd. 1918. . Online version at the Perseus Digital Library
 Pausanias, Graeciae Descriptio. 3 vols. Leipzig, Teubner. 1903.  Greek text available at the Perseus Digital Library.

Characters in Greek mythology